Un Guapo del 900 is a 1952 Argentine black-and-white film directed by Lucas Demare from a script by Ulyses Petit de Murat based on the play of the same name by Samuel Eichelbaum.

Cast
 Pedro Maratea
 Milagros de la Vega
 Guillermo Battaglia
 Nélida Bilbao
 Santiago Gómez Cou
 Lydia Quintana
 Gregorio Cicarelli
 Federico Mansilla
 Elisardo Santalla
 Ángel Prío
 Luis Otero
 Roberto Durán
 Néstor Deval
 César Fiaschi
 Jorge Villalba

External links

1952 films
1950s Spanish-language films
Argentine black-and-white films
Films directed by Lucas Demare
1950s Argentine films